This is a list of television programs currently and formerly broadcast by the Canadian television channel Prise 2.

Current programming
This a list of programs currently being broadcast as of October 14, 2011:

Canadian shows 
 Les Brillant
 Fort Boyard
 Les grands procès
 Les Lions De Anjou
 The Littlest Hobo (Le Vagabond)
 Samedi de rire
 Soirée Canadienne
 Surprise sur Prise

Foreign 
 Adam-12 (Auto-patrouille)
 Bewitched (Ma sorcière bien-aimée)
 Columbo
 The Flintstones (Les Pierrafeu)
 The Flying Nun (La Soeur Volante)
 Little House on the Prairie (Le petite maison dans la prairie)
 Mission: Impossible (Mission: impossible)
 Three's Company (Vivre à Trois)

Past

Canadian shows 
 Blanche
 Chambres en ville
 Chop Suey
 Le Clan Beaulieu
 Entre chien et loup
 Fais-moi un dessin
 Les Filles de Caleb
 L'or du temps
 Les Moineau et les Pinson
 Peau de banane
 Scoop
 Symphorien

Foreign 
 The A-Team (Agence tous Risques)
 Airwolf (Supercopter)
 Beauty and the Beast (la Belle et la Bête)
 The Benny Hill Show
 Beverly Hills, 90210
 Bonanza
 Charlie's Angels (Drôle de dames)
 Dallas
 Dynasty (Dynastie)
 East of Eden (À l'Est d'Eden)
 Fantasy Island (L'Île Fantaisie)
 The Fugitive (Le Fugitif)
 The Golden Girls (Carré de dames)
 I Dream of Jeannie (Jinny)
 The Incredible Hulk (L'Incroyable Hulk)
 Knight Rider (K 2000)
 Kojak (Chez Kojak)
 Land of the Giants (Au Pays Des Géant)
 Lost in Space (Perdus dans l'Espace)
 The Love Boat (La Croisière s'amuse)
 Lucky Luke
 The Rockford Files (Rockford Enquête)
 Roots (Racines)
 The Saint (Le Saint)
 The Six Million Dollar Man (L'Homme de six millions)
 Star Trek (La Patrouille du Cosmos)
 The Time Tunnel (Au Coeur du Temps)
 V (V: Les Visiteurs)
 Voyage to the Bottom of the Sea (Voyage au Fond de la Mer)
 Who's the Boss? (Madame est servie)
 Wonder Woman

Animated

 Casper
 Mr. Magoo (Quoi de neuf, Mr. Magoo?)
 Teenage Mutant Ninja Turtles (Les tortues ninja)
 Yogi Bear (Yogi et ses amis)

Prise 2